Reay Tannahill (9 December 1929 – 2 November 2007) was a British historian, non-fiction writer, and novelist, best known perhaps for two non-fiction bestsellers: Food in History and Sex in History. She also wrote under the pseudonym Annabel Laine. Her novel Passing Glory won in 1990 the Romantic Novel of the Year Award by the Romantic Novelists' Association.

Biography

Personal life
Reay Tannahill was born on 9 December 1929 in Glasgow, Scotland, where she was brought up. Her forename was the maiden name of her mother, Olive Reay. She was educated at Shawlands Academy, and obtained an MA in history and a postgraduate certificate in Social Sciences at the University of Glasgow.

In 1958, she married Michael Edwardes; the marriage ended in divorce in 1983 and he died in 1990.

Until her death on 2 November 2007 she lived in a terraced house in London near Tate Britain.

Career
Before she started to write, she worked as a probation officer, advertising copywriter, newspaper reporter, historical researcher and graphic designer. She published her first non-fiction book in 1964. With the international success that came with the book Food in History, her publisher suggested a companion volume on the second great human imperative, Sex in History. For her 2002 revised edition of Food in History, she won the Premio Letterario Internazionale Chianti Ruffino Antico Fattore.

She also wrote historical romance novels, and in 1990, her novel Passing Glory won in 1990 the Romantic Novel of the Year Award by the Romantic Novelists' Association.

She belonged to the Arts Club and the Authors' Club, and was chairman of the latter from 1997 to 2000.

Bibliography

As Reay Tannahill

Non-fiction works
 Regency England: The Great Age of the Colour Print (1964)
 Paris in the Revolution: A Collection of Eye-witness Accounts (1966)
 The Fine Art of Food (1969)
 Food in History (1973) (Stein and Day publishers)
 Flesh & Blood: A History of the Cannibal Complex (1975)
 Sex in History (1980)

Historical fiction

Single novels
 A Dark and Distant Shore (1983)
 The World, the Flesh and the Devil (1985)
 Passing Glory (1989)
 In Still and Stormy Waters (1992)
 Return of the Stranger (1995)
 Fatal Majesty: A Novel of Mary, Queen of Scots (1998)
 The Seventh Son (2001)

Dame Constance de Clair Series
 Having the Builders in (2006)
 Having the Decorators in (2007)

As Annabel Laine
 The Reluctant Heiress (1979)
 The Melancholy Virgin (1982)

References and sources

External links
Obituary in The Times, 27 December 2007
A Dark and Distant Shore: Tannahill's working papers, research notes and draft copies (ref. DM1294/9/4/3) Penguin Archive, University of Bristol Library Special Collections

1929 births
2007 deaths
Scottish historical novelists
20th-century Scottish historians
RoNA Award winners
20th-century British novelists
21st-century British novelists
20th-century British women writers
21st-century British women writers
Women romantic fiction writers
British women novelists
Women historical novelists
British women historians
Pseudonymous women writers
Writers of historical fiction set in the early modern period
20th-century pseudonymous writers